The Feldberg/Taunus transmitter is a facility for FM- and TV-broadcasting and for directional radio services located on the Großer Feldberg, the highest mountain in the Taunus region of Germany.

For FM- and TV-broadcasting; a  guyed tubular mast is used, while for radio relay services a tower of unique design is used, which is a combination of a multistory building and a telecommunications tower.

History 

This tower was built in 1937 as a  reinforced concrete construction with an upper section built of wood. Intended as a television tower for the Rhine Main Area, it became a radar station during World War II. Before the end of World War II, the tower was heavily damaged by bombs, and the structure burned down.

In 1950, reconstruction of the tower was started. The lower 5 floors were reused in the  reinforced concrete base. On these a  structural steel framework with 5 floors was set up. This carried a  timber construction with 9 floors, so that the tower (without the UHF antenna installed on the top) has a total height of 69.13 metres.

Since numerous directional antennas were set up, all connections of the wooden upper building had to be manufactured without metal.

Present status 
The tower is now a protected monument.

See also
List of towers
List of masts

External links
 
 http://www.skyscraperpage.com/diagrams/?b41551
 http://skyscraperpage.com/diagrams/?b58367
 Google Maps: Fernmeldeturm Grosser Feldberg

Radio masts and towers in Germany
Buildings and structures in Hesse
Wooden towers
Towers completed in 1937
1937 establishments in Germany